The Central Synagogue is based between Hallam Street and Great Portland Street in London. The current building was constructed in 1958, after the original synagogue was destroyed during the London Blitz on 10 May 1941.

References

External links

Jewishgen.org

Synagogues in London
Synagogues completed in 1958
1958 establishments in England